American Experience is a television program airing on the Public Broadcasting Service (PBS) in the United States. The program airs documentaries, many of which have won awards, about important or interesting events and people in American history.

The series premiered on October 4, 1988 and was originally titled The American Experience, but the definite article was later dropped during a rebrand and image update. The show has had a presence on the internet since 1995, and more than 100 American Experience programs are accompanied by their own internet websites, which have more background information on the subjects covered as well as teachers' guides and educational companion materials. The show is produced primarily by WGBH-TV in Boston, Massachusetts, though occasionally in the early seasons of the show, it was co-produced by other PBS stations such as WNET (Channel 13) in New York City.

Some programs now considered part of the American Experience collection were produced prior to the creation of the series. Vietnam: A Television History was one of them, airing originally in 1983 after taking six years to assemble. Also, in 2006, American Experience rebroadcast Eyes on the Prize: America's Civil Rights Years, the first half of the 1986 documentary series about the Civil Rights Movement during the 1950s and 1960s.

Episodes

Critical reception
American Experience has received generally positive reviews from television critics and parents of young children. Glenn McNatt of The Baltimore Sun wrote that it is "TV's finest history series ever." Steve Johnson of Chicago Tribune wrote, "History comes alive in excellent docu-series."

Home media
A DVD boxset collecting episodes about United States presidents was released on August 26, 2008. The collection was updated to include the documentary on Bill Clinton's presidency on August 28, 2012.

A DVD boxset for the five-part documentary We Shall Remain was released on May 12, 2009.

Awards

References

External links
American Experience website

 
1988 American television series debuts
1980s American documentary television series
1990s American documentary television series
2000s American documentary television series
2010s American documentary television series
2020s American documentary television series
PBS original programming
Peabody Award-winning television programs
Television series about the history of the United States
Television series by WGBH